The Sixth Doctor: The Last Adventure is a British audio drama based on the long-running British science fiction television series Doctor Who.

Within the narrative of the series, the Doctor, its principal character, is a time-travelling alien known as a Time Lord, whose biological characteristics allow him to regenerate into a new form to circumvent an otherwise deadly experience; the device has been used to allow for a change in lead actor every few years in the production of the televised series. The sixth such instance was depicted in 1987 at the very beginning of Time and the Rani, but due to the firing between seasons of Sixth Doctor actor Colin Baker, the episode gave the event very little screen time and didn't explain what had caused it.

Big Finish Productions producer David Richardson approached Baker in 2014, after seeing "The Time of the Doctor", which had depicted (on television) the regeneration of the Eleventh Doctor into the Twelfth: "I felt very strongly that regeneration stories, and each Doctor’s final end, are very important to Doctor Who fans – these are stories that allow us to see the Doctor at his most courageous, making a sacrifice that only makes us love him more." Baker, who had been working with Big Finish since 1999, agreed to participate, saying that his depiction of the Doctor "did not benefit from" the difficult circumstances the show faced in the 1980s, and that the quality of Big Finish's work was "the only reason [he had] agreed to bring [his] Doctor to an end."

The audio drama consists of four one-hour episodes, each by a different author and each pairing the Doctor with a different companion and taking place at a different point in his life, but all unified by the presence of the villainous Valeyard, a potential future version of the Doctor introduced in Baker's last television serial, The Trial of a Time Lord. Besides Baker, Michael Jayston and Bonnie Langford reprised their roles from The Trial of a Time Lord, respectively as the Valeyard and as the Doctor's companion Mel.

The final part (The Brink of Death) explains that the Sixth Doctor dies due to the radiation of the planet Lakertya as part of his sacrifice in order to stop the Valeyard from taking over existence.

Cast list and Plot summaries 
 The Doctor — Colin Baker
 The Valeyard — Michael Jayston (appears in all four episodes but is not credited for his cameo in The End of the Line)

The End of the Line
The Doctor and his new companion Constance investigate a dimensional nexus made out of a train station with ever-increasing platforms and people who appear multiple times, who are all dead.
 Constance Clarke — Miranda Raison
 Tim Hope — Anthony Howell
 Keith Potter — Chris Finney
 Alice Lloyd — Ony Uhiara
 Norman — Hamish Clark
 Hilary Ratchett — Maggie Service

The Red House
The Doctor and Charley investigate a village populated by inverted werewolves- peaceful in their wolf states and ruthless Neanderthal-esque figures in their human states- and by scientists who attempt to normalize them.
 Charlotte Pollard — India Fisher
 Sergeant — Ashley McGuire
 Dr Paignton/Constable — Andree Bernard
 Ugo — Rory Keenan
 Lina — Jessie Buckley
 Arin/Dennis — Kieran Hodgson

Stage Fright
The Valeyard crosses paths with the Doctor's old friends Henry Jago and Professor Litefoot in Victorian London, where he stages a play that seems to recall the Doctor's previous regenerations.
 Flip — Lisa Greenwood
 Henry Gordon Jago — Christopher Benjamin
 Professor George Litefoot — Trevor Baxter
 Ellie Higson — Lisa Bowerman
 Susie/Sylvie — Andree Bernard
 Bella — Lizzie Roper

The Brink of Death
With the Valeyard's plan coming to fruition, the Doctor finds himself trapped in a cold 'Hell' of isolation, unable to stop the Valeyard from taking his place at Mel's side, and soon, much, much more than that...
 Melanie Bush — Bonnie Langford
 Genesta — Liz White
 Coordinator Storin/Nathemus 1 — Robbie Stevens
 Lorelas/Nathemus 2 — Susan Earnshaw
 Seventh Doctor — Sylvester McCoy
 The Rani — Kate O'Mara

Notes
 Due to the delay of Criss-Cross, the story which introduces Constance Clarke as a new companion for the Doctor, The End of the Line was (unexpectedly) the first story released to feature the character.
 This is the first audio drama and the first Big Finish story to depict the Doctor's regeneration, although "Winter", the final part of Circular Time (an earlier release also structured as four separate but connected stories), takes place during the Fifth Doctor's regeneration, as seen in The Caves of Androzani. "The Lying Old Witch in the Wardrobe", a short story published as part of the Big Finish Short Trips range, similarly expanded upon a Time Lord regeneration not seen to be properly explained in the television series, this time of the Doctor's companion Romana in Destiny of the Daleks.

References

2015 audio plays
Sixth Doctor audio plays
The Master (Doctor Who) audio plays
Seventh Doctor audio plays